Merv "Spam" Spence is a Northern Irish musician and producer, best known for his work with Wishbone Ash and Trapeze.

Musical career
Spence moved to Staffordshire from Ireland in the late 1970s, and began playing with bands such as The Jury and Big Daisy.

Trapeze
During Spence's time in local bands, he was spotted by Mel Galley, who promptly offered Spence the bassist and vocalist position in Trapeze, which had been left vacant since Peter Goalby had left to join Uriah Heep.  Spence briefly toured with the band, and during his tenure recorded one album's worth of material, which – due to Galley's departure to replace Bernie Marsden in Whitesnake – remains unreleased. Several of the songs from these sessions however (Demos exist in bootleg form), would form a very small part of Tom Galley's Phenomena project, which Spence would later join to sing and play bass on the 1992 album "Innervision" (billed as "O'Ryan")

Spence later went on to buy the rights to the project, cashing in (and dining out) with a 'best of' compilation which featured a very small percentage of his work tagged onto the work of the real members of the project.

Wishbone Ash
Following the break-up of Trapeze, Spence was offered an audition for Wishbone Ash while he was pitching demo material to various outlets.  On the strength of his vocal range and enthusiasm, Spence became a member of the band. Spence would perform on one album by the band, 1985's Raw to the Bone.

Post-Wishbone Ash
Spence left Wishbone Ash in 1986 "to pursue family matters".  He has since released two solo albums under the name "O'Ryan" (his mother's maiden name), 1993's Something Strong and 1995's Initiate.

Spence secured a job lecturing music industry topics at Walsall College of Arts and Technology in the mid 1990s while hitting hard times musically.

Discography

Solo
 Something Strong (1993; as "O'Ryan")
 Emer May (1995; as "O'Ryan")
 Initiate (1995; as "O'Ryan")

with Wishbone Ash
 Raw to the Bone (1985)
 40th Anniversary Concert: Live In London (2010)

with Face Face
 Childhood Dreams (1994)
 Bridge to Nowhere (2006)

with Purple Cross
 Eyes of the Mirror (2000)

with Phenomena
 Phenomena III - Inner Vision (1992, as "O'Ryan")
The Complete Works (2006)

with Big Daisy
 Big Daisy (2012)

References

1956 births
Living people
people from Larne
Male singers from Northern Ireland
Songwriters from Northern Ireland
Rock singers from Northern Ireland
Rock guitarists from Northern Ireland
Male bass guitarists
Wishbone Ash members
Bass guitarists from Northern Ireland